Maud is a town on the boundary between Pottawatomie and Seminole counties in the U.S. state of Oklahoma. The population was 1,048 at the 2010 census, a 7.8 percent decrease from the figure of 1,136 in 2000. The town was named for Maud Stearns, a sister to the wives of two men who owned the first general store.

History
This community was established by 1890 on the dividing line between Oklahoma Territory and Indian Territory. In 1890, a barbed-wire fence was built along the street now called Broadway from the North Canadian River to the Canadian River to keep the Native Americans out of Oklahoma Territory. However, the fence failed to prevent the illegal sale of alcohol to residents of Indian Territory.

A post office was established on April 16, 1896. 

In January 1898, a mob lynched two Seminole teenagers, Lincoln McGeisey and Palmer Sampson, by burning them alive near this same post office, in retaliation for their alleged murder of a white woman. Newspapers reported that the charred bodies remained chained to an oak tree for several days after the mob murdered them. Unlike in most lynchings, some members of the mob were actually convicted of participating in the violence. When one of these men was released from the federal penitentiary in Leavenworth in 1906, a celebratory crowd welcomed him home to Maud.

A railroad station was built by the Missouri, Kansas and Texas Railway in 1903. The first newspaper, Maud Monitor, appeared in 1904, and lasted until about 1919.  The city was formally incorporated on July 21, 1905. The 1910 census showed a population of 503.

Maud became a boom town in the early 1920s because oil was discovered nearby. The peak population was estimated at ten thousand. The boom was short-lived and the population was only 4,326 at the 1930 census.

Geography
Maud is located at  (35.131809, -96.777527). According to the United States Census Bureau, the city has a total area of 1.0 square miles (2.58 km2), all land.

Demographics

As of the census of 2000, there were 1,136 people, 435 households, and 301 families residing in the city. The population density was 1,174.3 people per square mile (452.2/km2). There were 523 housing units at an average density of 540.6 per square mile (208.2/km2). The racial makeup of the city was 78.52% White, 0.18% Native American, 13.73% Native American, 0.26% Asian, 0.18% Pacific Islander, 0.26% from other races, and 6.87% from two or more races. Hispanic or Latino of any race were 2.55% of the population.

There were 435 households, out of which 36.6% had children under the age of 18 living with them, 51.3% were married couples living together, 14.7% had a female householder with no husband present, and 30.8% were non-families. 27.4% of all households were made up of individuals, and 15.4% had someone living alone who was 65 years of age or older. The average household size was 2.52 and the average family size was 3.07.

In the city, the population was spread out, with 28.1% under the age of 18, 9.0% from 18 to 24, 26.1% from 25 to 44, 19.8% from 45 to 64, and 17.0% who were 65 years of age or older. The median age was 36 years. For every 100 females, there were 85.3 males. For every 100 females age 18 and over, there were 80.4 males.

The median income for a household in the city was $22,604, and the median income for a family was $27,847. Males had a median income of $26,944 versus $15,625 for females. The per capita income for the city was $12,719. About 19.2% of families and 22.7% of the population were below the poverty line, including 25.0% of those under age 18 and 21.3% of those age 65 or over.

Notable people
Edmond Harjo, the last surviving Seminole Code Talker during World War II and a 2013 recipient of the Congressional Gold Medal, resided within or near Maud for most of his life.
Wanda Jackson, pioneering rockabilly singer, known as the "Queen of Rockabilly," who has a street (Wanda Jackson Boulevard) named after her.

References

Cities in Pottawatomie County, Oklahoma
Cities in Seminole County, Oklahoma
Cities in Oklahoma
Populated places established in 1890